The Diocese of Morogoro is an eastern diocese in the Anglican Church of Tanzania: its current bishop is the Right Reverend Godfrey Sehaba.

Notes

External links 

 Official Website

Anglican Church of Tanzania dioceses
Anglican bishops of Morogoro
Morogoro